Karl James MBE (born 30 March 1967) is an Antigua and Barbuda sailor. He competed at the 1996 Summer Olympics and the 2000 Summer Olympics.

He was appointed MBE in the 2020 New Year Honours.

References

External links
 

1967 births
Living people
Antigua and Barbuda male sailors (sport)
Members of the Order of the British Empire
Olympic sailors of Antigua and Barbuda
Sailors at the 1996 Summer Olympics – Laser
Sailors at the 2000 Summer Olympics – Laser
Place of birth missing (living people)